The 2012 NCAA Division I softball tournament was held from May 18 through June 6, 2012 as the final part of the 2012 NCAA Division I softball season. The 64 NCAA Division I college softball teams were selected out of an eligible 284 teams on May 13, 2012. 30 teams were awarded an automatic bid as champions of their conference, and 34 teams were selected at-large by the NCAA Division I Softball Selection Committee. The tournament culminated with eight teams playing in the 2012 Women's College World Series at ASA Hall of Fame Stadium in Oklahoma City.

Alabama won the national title, defeating  2–1 in the best-of-three final to win the program's first national championship, and also the first softball title for any Southeastern Conference school.

Automatic bids

National seeds
Teams in "italics" advanced to super regionals.
Teams in "bold" advanced to Women's College World Series.

California
Alabama

Florida

 
 
 
 
 
 Louisiana–Lafayette

Regionals and super regionals

Berkeley Super Regional

Columbia Super Regional

Tampa Super Regional

Norman Super Regional

Tempe Super Regional

Austin Super Regional

Knoxville Super Regional

Tuscaloosa Super Regional

Women's College World Series

Participants

† Excludes results of the pre-NCAA Women's College World Series of 1969 through 1981.

Results

Bracket
All times are Central Time Zone

Game results

Championship game

Final standings

All-Tournament Team
Amber Freeman, Arizona State
Samantha Pappas, Oregon
Alexa Peterson, Oregon
Lauren Chamberlain, Oklahoma
Destinee Martinez, Oklahoma
Keilani Ricketts, Oklahoma
Jessica Shults, Oklahoma
Brianna Turang, Oklahoma
Kayla Braud, Alabama
Jennifer Fenton, Alabama
Amanda Locke, Alabama
Jackie Traina, Alabama (Most Valuable Player)

Post-series notes
Jackie Traina was named the Women's College World Series MVP. Traina pitched 42 innings, surrendering 18 earned runs on 35 hits and 24 walks while striking out 45 to lead Alabama to its first national softball title. It was also the first national softball title for the SEC.

External links
http://www.ncaa.com/brackets/softball/d1/
http://www.ncaa.com/sports/ncaa-w-softbl-body.html

References

NCAA Division I softball tournament
Tournament